Horace Miller (born 26 October 1989) is a Jamaican cricketer who plays for the Jamaican national side in West Indian domestic cricket, and has also represented the Jamaica Tallawahs franchise in the Caribbean Premier League (CPL). He is a right-handed batsman and occasional wicket-keeper.

Miller played for the West Indies under-19s at the 2008 Under-19 World Cup in Malaysia. He made his senior debut for Jamaica in the 2008–09 WICB Cup, a limited-overs competition, and his first-class debut against Trinidad and Tobago in the 2009–10 Regional Four Day Competition. In the match, Miller scored 66 runs in his team's first innings, which remains his highest first-class score to date. He is yet to play a full season for Jamaica, and so far has generally been used as a specialist batsman, with either Carlton Baugh or Chadwick Walton taking the gloves. For the 2015 Caribbean Premier League season, Miller signed with the Jamaica Tallawahs franchise, playing four games.

References

External links
Player profile and statistics at CricketArchive
Player profile and statistics at ESPNcricinfo

1989 births
Living people
Jamaica cricketers
Jamaican cricketers
Jamaica Tallawahs cricketers